Tadeusz Wrona may refer to:

 Tadeusz Wrona (aviator) (born 1958), Polish civil pilot
 Tadeusz Wrona (politician) (born 1951), Polish politician, MP, mayor of Częstochowa